Solapur Lok Sabha constituency (42) is one of the 48 Lok Sabha (parliamentary) constituencies in Maharashtra state in western India.

Vidhan Sabha segments
Presently, after delimitation, Solapur Lok Sabha constituency comprises the following six Vidhan Sabha (legislative assembly) segments:

Members of Lok Sabha

^ by-poll

Election results

General elections 2019

General elections 2014

General Elections 2009

See also
 Madha Lok Sabha constituency
 Pandharpur Lok Sabha constituency
 Solapur district
 List of Constituencies of the Lok Sabha

Notes

External links
Solapur lok sabha  constituency election 2019 results details

Lok Sabha constituencies in Maharashtra
Solapur district